Cubi XII is an abstract sculpture by  David Smith.

Constructed of stainless steel, completed on April 7 1963, it was purchased from his estate by the Hirshhorn Museum and Sculpture Garden in 1968. 

It is a part of the Cubi series.
He used the shiny finish to contrast with the landscape. The circular grind marks change in varying lighting conditions.

See also
 List of public art in Washington, D.C., Ward 2

References

1963 sculptures
Hirshhorn Museum and Sculpture Garden
Modernist sculpture
Outdoor sculptures in Washington, D.C.
Sculptures by David Smith
Sculptures of the Smithsonian Institution
Steel sculptures in Washington, D.C.